Alexandra Feodorovna (– 17 July 1918), Princess Alix of Hesse and by Rhine at birth,  was the last Empress of Russia as the consort of Emperor Nicholas II from their marriage on  until his forced abdication on . A favourite granddaughter of Queen Victoria of the United Kingdom, she was, like her grandmother, one of the most famous royal carriers of haemophilia and bore a haemophiliac heir, Alexei Nikolaevich, Tsarevich of Russia. Her reputation for encouraging her husband's resistance to the surrender of autocratic authority and her known faith in the Russian mystic Grigori Rasputin severely damaged her popularity and that of the Romanov monarchy in its final years. She and her immediate family were all murdered while in Bolshevik captivity in 1918, during the Russian Revolution. In 2000, the Russian Orthodox Church canonized her as Saint Alexandra the Passion Bearer.

Appearance and personality

Alexandra was a noted beauty. Her maternal grandmother Queen Victoria praised her as "a most lovely child." Her friend Anna Vyrubova described her as "tall...and delicately, beautifully shaped, with exquisitely white neck and shoulders. Her abundant hair, red gold, was so long that she could easily sit upon it when it was unbound. Her complexion was clear and as rosy as a little child's. The Empress had large eyes, deep gray and very lustrous." A lady-in-waiting, Baroness Sophie Buxhoeveden, said that she was "a tall, slim girl" with "beautiful luminous eyes," "regular features," a "very good complexion," and "beautiful golden hair." An Imperial courtier commented favourably about "her wonderful hair which lay like a heavy crown on her head and large dark-blue eyes beneath long lashes." In 1905, her daughters' tutor Pierre Gilliard wrote that "the Tsarina was still a beautiful woman at that time. She was tall and slender and carried herself superbly. But all this ceased the moment one looked into her eyes—those speaking, grey-blue eyes which mirrored the emotions of a sensitive soul."

Alexandra was shy. When her grandmother Queen Victoria insisted that she play the piano for others, she felt that her "clammy hands... [were] literally glued to the keys" and later described the experience as "one of the worst ordeals" of her life. When she was Empress, a page in the Imperial household described her as "so obviously nervous of conversation" and claimed that "at moments when she needed to show some social graces or a charming smile, her face would become suffused with little red spots and she would look intensely serious." Grand Duke Constantine Constantinovich of Russia noted that she "is terribly shy... It's noticeable that she does not have her mother-in-law's charm, and still does not, therefore, inspire general adulation." Nadine Wonar-Larsky, her lady-in-waiting, noted that she was "extremely shy even at such an informal affair as receiving" Wonlar-Larsky and her mother to tea. An Imperial courtier notes that "when she was conversing or grew tired, her face became covered in red blotches [and] her hands were red and fleshy." She herself admitted that during social functions, she "long[ed] to disappear into the ground." She told her friend Marie Bariatinsky that "I am not made to shine before an assembly—I have not got the easy nor the witty talk one needs for that."

Alexandra's natural shyness was often mistaken as haughtiness. Her brother Ernest Louis reflected that "she would unsmilingly tilt her head to one side if something displeased her, with the result that people often thought that she was unhappy, or bored, or simply capricious." Her daughters' tutor Pierre Gilliard reflected that "the reserve which so many people had taken as an affront and had made her so many enemies was rather the effect of a natural timidity, as it were—a mask covering her sensitiveness."

Even from a young age, Alexandra was serious and melancholic. Her first cousin and childhood friend Princess Marie Louise said that she had "a curious atmosphere of fatality." Princess Marie Louise allegedly asked her, "Alix, you always play at being sorrowful; one day the Almighty will send you some real crushing sorrows, and then what are you going to do?" Sir George William Buchanan, who was a diplomat for Alexandra's grandmother Queen Victoria, reflected that Alexandra had a "sad and pathetic expression."

Alexandra was extremely religious. Although she loved Nicholas II, she initially refused his proposal because she refused to convert from Lutheranism and join the Russian Orthodox Church, as was expected of all wives of Russian Emperors. She told Nicholas that even though "it grieves me terribly and makes me very unhappy" not to marry him, leaving the Lutheran church would be "a wrongful thing."

Alexandra was generous to her friends and often tried to help others. Her lady-in-waiting Sophie Buxhoeveden wrote that she was "ready to do literally anything for her friends" and that "she would take up things and people with violent enthusiasm." She admitted that "I am of the preacher type. I want to help others in life, to help them to fight their battles and bear their crosses."

Alexandra was intellectual and well-read. In her first years as Empress, she translated Russian writings and studied Russian music to improve her command of the language. She read Leo Tolstoy's novels and discussed them with her husband.

Alexandra enjoyed music. When she was young, she played the banjo and sang duets for hours with Queen Victoria's Lady in Waiting Minnie Cochrane. She enjoyed playing the piano with her daughter Olga, who inherited her musical talent.

Early life

Alexandra was born on 6 June 1872 at the New Palace in Darmstadt as Princess Alix Viktoria Helene Luise Beatrix of Hesse and by Rhine, a Grand Duchy then part of the German Empire. She was the sixth child and fourth daughter among the seven children of Louis IV, Grand Duke of Hesse, and his first wife, Princess Alice of the United Kingdom, the second daughter of Queen Victoria and her husband Albert, Prince Consort.

Alix was baptized on 1 July 1872 (her parents' tenth wedding anniversary) in the Protestant Lutheran Church and given the names of her mother and each of her mother's four sisters, some of which were transliterated into German. Her mother wrote to Queen Victoria, "'Alix' we gave for 'Alice' as they murder my name here: 'Ali-ice' they pronounce it, so we thought 'Alix' could not so easily be spoilt." Her mother gave her the nickname of "Sunny", due to her cheerful disposition, a name adopted later by her husband. Her British relatives nicknamed her as "Alicky", to distinguish her from her aunt-by-marriage, Alexandra, Princess of Wales, who was known within the family as Alix.

Alix's godparents were the Prince and Princess of Wales (her maternal uncle and aunt), Princess Beatrice of the United Kingdom (her maternal aunt), the Duchess of Cambridge (her great-great-aunt), the Tsesarevich and Tsesarevna of Russia (her future parents-in-law), and Princess Anna of Prussia.

Alix's older brother Prince Friedrich of Hesse and by Rhine ("Frittie") suffered from hemophilia and died in May 1873 after a fall, when Alix was about one year old. Of her siblings, Alix was closest to Princess Marie ("May"), who was two years younger; they were noted as "inseparable".

In November 1878, diphtheria swept through the House of Hesse; Alix, her three sisters, her brother Ernst ("Ernie"), and their father fell ill. Elisabeth ("Ella"), Alix's older sister, was visiting their paternal grandmother, and escaped the outbreak. Alix's mother Alice tended to the children herself, rather than abandon them to nurses and doctors. Alice fell ill and died on 14 December 1878, when Alix was six years old. This was the 17th anniversary of Alice's own father's death. Marie also died, but the rest of the siblings survived. She described her childhood before her mother and sister's deaths as "unclouded, happy babyhood, of perpetual sunshine, then of a great cloud".

Queen Victoria doted on the motherless Alix and became a surrogate mother to Alix. She felt highly protective of Alix and declared that "while I live Alicky, til she is married, will be more than ever my own child." She handpicked Alix's tutors and instructed them to send detailed reports back to Windsor every month. She invited Alix and her surviving siblings to England for their holidays, and they grew close to their British cousins. Every birthday and Christmas, she sent Alix gifts of dresses, jewelry, lace, and dolls. Unlike her other siblings, Alix signed herself "your loving and grateful child," rather than grandchild, in her letters. Alix reflected that she saw Queen Victoria as "the best and dearest of grandmamas," "a very august person," "a Santa Clause,"  and "the dearest and kindest Woman alive." When she was betrothed to Nicholas, Alix assured Victoria that "my marrying will [not] make a difference to my love for You." When Queen Victoria died in 1901, Alix openly wept at her memorial service in St. Petersburg and shocked the Russian courtiers who considered her cold and unfeeling.

Along with her sister, Princess Irene, Alix was a bridesmaid at the 1885 wedding of her godmother and maternal aunt, Princess Beatrice, to Prince Henry of Battenberg. At the age of 15, she attended Queen Victoria's Golden Jubilee celebrations in 1887.

In March 1892, when Alix was just nineteen years old, her father Grand Duke Louis IV, died of a heart attack. According to her biographer, Baroness Buxhoeveden, Alix regarded the death of her father as the greatest sorrow of her life. Buxhoeveden recalled in her 1928 biography that "for years she could not speak of him, and long after when she was in Russia, anything that reminded her of him would bring her to the verge of tears". This loss was probably so much greater for Alix because Grand Duke Louis IV had been Alix's only remaining parent since she was six.

Proposed matches
Queen Victoria greatly favored Alix and she wanted Alix to become the Queen Consort of the United Kingdom, which she considered "the greatest position there is." On 2 March 1888, she wrote to Alix's oldest sister Victoria that "My heart and mind are bent on securing dear Alicky for either Eddie or Georgie." She pressured Alix to accept a proposal from her first cousin and the heir apparent to the British throne, Prince Albert Victor, Duke of Clarence and Avondale. In 1889, Victoria invited Alix and Eddy to Balmoral in hopes that they would fall in love. Eddy grew infatuated with her and proposed, but Alix was not interested in him and rejected his proposal. However, Victoria still persisted and tried to convince Alix of the benefits of the match. Victoria wrote to Princess Victoria of Hesse and by Rhine, Alix's older sister, that Alix "should be made to reflect seriously on the folly of throwing away the chance of a very good husband, kind, affectionate and steady, and of entering a united happy family and a very good position which is second to none in the world!" Alix's older sister Ella opposed the match because "he [Eddy] does not look over strong and is too stupid." In May 1890, Alix wrote a letter to Eddy that although it "pained her to pain him," she only saw him as a cousin and could not marry him. She wrote to Victoria that she would marry Eddy if she were "forced" by the family but that both of them would be miserable. Victoria was disappointed, but she decided that Alix had shown "great strength of character" in refusing to acquiesce to such strong pressure.

In 1891, Queen Victoria tried to arrange a match between Alix and Prince Maximilian of Baden. She asked Louis to invite Max to Darmstadt as soon as possible. When he arrived in Darmstadt, Max told Alix that he intended to propose to her. Alix was surprised and unhappy, and she later reflected that "I did not know him at all." She asked her older sister Victoria to intervene and help her reject Max politely.

Engagement
In 1884, Alix attended the wedding of her sister Elisabeth to Grand Duke Sergei Alexandrovich in St. Petersburg. At this wedding, the 12-year-old Alix met the 16-year-old Grand Duke Nicholas, nephew of the groom and heir-apparent to the Imperial throne of Russia. In his diary Nicholas called Alix "sweet little Alix" and declared "we love each other." He gave her a brooch as a sign of his affection, and they scratched their names into a windowpane.

In January 1890, Alix visited her sister Ella in Russia. She and Nicholas skated together, met at tea parties, and played badminton. Nicholas wrote in his diary: "It is my dream to one day marry Alix H. I have loved her for a long time, but more deeply and strongly since 1889 when she spent six weeks in Petersburg. For a long time, I have resisted my feeling that my dearest dream will come true."

Alix's sister Ella and her husband Sergei were enthusiastically in favor of the match between Nicholas and Alix. The future Edward VII told his mother Queen Victoria that "Ella will move heaven and earth to get [Alix] to marry a Grand Duke." Ella wrote to Ernest, “God grant this marriage will come true."

Nicholas and Alix were second cousins through a great-grandmother, Princess Wilhelmina of Baden, and they were third cousins once removed through Frederick William II of Prussia, who was Alix's great-great-grandfather and Nicholas's great-great-great-grandfather. Nicholas's mother, Empress Maria Feodorovna (Dagmar of Denmark), was Alix's godmother and the younger sister of Alexandra of Denmark, who married Alix's uncle Edward VII. Her sister Ella had married Nicholas's uncle Sergei. Her uncle Prince Alfred, Duke of Edinburgh had married Nicholas's aunt Grand Duchess Maria Alexandrovna of Russia.

Queen Victoria opposed the match to Nicholas. She personally liked Nicholas, but she disliked Russia and Nicholas's father and worried that Alix would not be safe in Russia. She wrote to Alix's older sister Victoria of her suspicions that Sergei and Ella were encouraging the match. After the betrothal was announced, she reflected: “The more I think of sweet Alicky's marriage the more unhappy I am. Not as to the personality for I like [Nicholas] very much but on account of the country and the awful insecurity to which that poor child will be exposed.”

Alexander and Maria Feodorovna were both vehemently anti-German and did not want Alix as a daughter-in-law. Maria Feodorovna told her sister Alexandra of Denmark that the youngest daughter of an undistinguished grand duke was not worthy to marry the heir to the Russian throne, and she believed that Alix was too tactless and unlikeable to be a successful Empress. Alexander favored Princess Hélène, the tall, dark-haired daughter of Philippe, Comte de Paris, pretender to the throne of France. Nicholas was not attracted to Hélène, writing in his diary: "Mama made a few allusions to Hélène, daughter of the Comte de Paris. I myself want to go in one direction and it is evident that Mama wants me to choose the other one." Hélène also resisted this match, as she was Roman Catholic and her father refused to allow her to convert to Russian Orthodoxy. Alexander sent emissaries to Princess Margaret of Prussia, sister of German Emperor Wilhelm II, and a granddaughter of Queen Victoria. Nicholas declared that he would rather become a monk than marry Margaret; she in turn was unwilling to convert to the Russian Orthodox Church from being Protestant.

When his health failed in 1894, Alexander III decided to allow Nicholas to marry Alix so that he could secure the succession. Marie reluctantly permitted Nicholas to propose to Alix. Nicholas was ecstatic and immediately inquired about Alix.

Despite her love for Nicholas, Alix was initially reluctant to marry Nicholas because she did not want to renounce her Lutheran faith to join the Orthodox church. She wrote to Nicholas that “I cannot [convert to Orthodoxy] against my conscience" because “What happiness can come from a marriage which begins without the real blessing of God?” Nicholas was devastated, but he remained hopeful because Ella assured him that Alix was "utterly miserable" and had a "deep and pure" love for him. Nicholas begged her "not [to] say 'no' directly"  and declared, “Do you think there can exist any happiness in the whole world without you!”

In April 1894, Alix's brother Ernest Louis married Princess Victoria Melita of Saxe-Coburg and Gotha. Princess Victoria was Alexander III's niece by his sister Grand Duchess Maria Alexandrovna of Russia and Nicholas's first cousin, so several Russians attended the wedding, including Grand Dukes Vladimir, Sergei and Paul, Grand Duchesses Elisabeth Feodorovna and Maria Pavlovna, and Nicholas. Nicholas was determined to convince Alix to marry him. He was evidently confident in his future success: He brought Father Ioann Yanyshev, confessor to the Imperial family, to teach Alix about Russian Orthodoxy, and he brought Ekaterina Adolfovna Schneider, to teach Alix Russian.

The day after his arrival in Coburg, Nicholas proposed to Alix and tried for two hours to convince her to convert to Orthodoxy. She wept continuously but refused. Ella spoke to Alix afterwards, and she convinced Alix that she did not need to renounce Lutheranism to convert to Orthodoxy. Ella herself had not been required to abjure her Lutheran faith when she converted to Orthodoxy. The next day, Alix spoke to Wilhelm II (who hoped that a German Empress would lead to better German-Russian relations) and Duchess Marie of Mecklenburg-Schwerin (a German princess who had converted from Lutheranism to Orthodoxy to marry Nicholas's uncle Grand Duke Vladimir Alexandrovich of Russia). She accepted Nicholas's second proposal.

Following the engagement, Alix returned to England and her grandmother. In June, Nicholas travelled to England to visit her and attend the christening of the eldest son of Prince George, Duke of York. Alix and Nicholas were both named as godparents of the boy, who reigned briefly as Edward VIII of Great Britain in 1936. Alix wrote to her old governess that "I am more happy than words can express. At last, after these five sad years!" Nicholas declared that "my soul was brimming with joy and life."

In September, as Alexander III's health declined, Nicholas obtained the permission of his dying father to summon Alix to the Romanovs' Crimean palace of Livadia. Escorted by her sister Ella from Warsaw to the Crimea, she traveled by ordinary passenger train. The dying tsar insisted on receiving Alix in full dress uniform and gave her his blessing.

Empress of Russia

Wedding

On 1 November 1894, Alexander III died at the age of forty-nine. Nicholas was confirmed as Tsar Nicholas II. The next day, Alix was received into the Russian Orthodox Church as "the truly believing Grand Duchess Alexandra Feodorovna." However, she was not required to repudiate Lutheranism. Alix wanted to take the name Yekaterina, but Nicholas wanted her to take the name Alexandra so that they could be a second Nicholas and Alexandra. He was inspired by his great-grandfather Nicholas I and his great-grandmother Alexandra Feodorovna.

Alexandra, the Prince and Princess of Wales, and Nicholas's Greek relatives accompanied the coffin of Alexander III first through Moscow and St. Petersburg. The funeral of Alexander III occurred on 19 November.

On 26 November 1894, Alexandra and Nicholas married in the Grand Church of the Winter Palace of Saint Petersburg. Court mourning could be relaxed because it was the birthday of Nicholas's mother, now Dowager Empress Maria Feodorovna. Many Russians considered Alexandra a bad omen because she arrived so soon after the death of Emperor Alexander: "She has come to us behind a coffin. She brings misfortune with her." Alexandra herself wrote to her sister: "Our wedding seemed to me, a mere continuation of the funeral liturgy for the dead Tsar, with one difference; I wore a white dress instead of a black one."

Coronation

On 14 May 1896, Alexandra and Nicholas were crowned at the Dormition Cathedral in the Kremlin.

Five hundred thousand Russians gathered in the capital to watch the entertainment, eat the court-sponsored food, and collect the gifts in honor of their new tsar. There were rumors that there was not enough food for everyone, so the crowd rushed towards the gift tables. The police failed to maintain order, and a thousand Russians were trampled to death at the Khodynka Field.

Nicholas and Alexandra were horrified by the deaths, and they decided not to attend the ball that the French ambassador, the Marquis de Montebello, hosted in their honor. Nicholas's uncles urged him to attend so as not to offend the French and give credence to the rumors that the German Alexandra was prejudiced against the French. Sergei Witte commented, "We expected the party would be called off. Instead it took place as if nothing had happened and the ball was opened by Their Majesties dancing a quadrille." The British ambassador informed Queen Victoria that "the Empress appeared in great distress, her eyes reddened by tears."

The next day, Alexandra and Nicholas visited the wounded and paid for the coffins of the dead. However, many Russians took the disaster at Khodynka Meadow as an omen that Nicholas's reign would be unhappy. Others used the circumstances of the tragedy and the behaviour of the royal establishment to underscore the heartlessness of the autocracy and the contemptible shallowness of the young tsar and his "German woman".

Rejection by the Russian people

Alexandra was extremely unpopular among her husband's Russian subjects. Her shy and introverted nature was interpreted as arrogance and coldness, and she struggled to win friends. The Russian court judged her as “devoid of charm, wooden, cold eyes, holds herself as if she'd swallowed a yardstick."

Alexandra struggled to communicate. She spoke English and German fluently, but she struggled to speak French, the official language of the court, and she did not start to learn Russian until she became Empress. She eventually learned Russian, but she spoke haltingly with a strong accent.

Alexandra failed to understand her public role at court as the Empress. Traditionally, the Empress led the social scene and hosted numerous balls. However, Alexandra was shocked by the love affairs and gossip that characterized parties. She declared that “the heads of the young ladies of St. Petersburg are filled with nothing but thoughts of young officers,” and she crossed off the names of noblemen and noblewomen whom she deemed scandalous from the invitation lists until no one was left. Many people in St. Petersburg society dismissed Alexandra as a prude. In one of her first balls, Alexandra sent a lady-in-waiting to reprimand a young woman in a low-cut gown: "Her Majesty wants me to tell you that in Hesse-Darmstadt we don't wear our dresses this way." The unnamed woman replied, "Pray tell Her Majesty that in Russia we do wear our dresses this way.” In 1896, she launched the "Help Through Handwork" project. She wanted to create a series of workshops in which noblewomen would teach poor peasants how to sew and raise funds for needy families.

Alexandra had a difficult relationship with her mother-in-law, Marie Feodorovna. Unlike other European courts of the day, Russian protocol gave the Dowager Empress seniority in rank to the Empress. At royal balls, Marie entered on her son's arm and Alexandra followed on the arm of one of the grand dukes. Marie was so accustomed to the tradition that she was surprised when Alexandra was bitter about her junior role at court. The crown jewels were the property of the current Empress, but Marie refused to relinquish them to Alexandra. Marie begrudgingly surrendered the magnificent collection when Alexandra threatened to not wear jewels to official court events.

Alexandra was unpopular in the Imperial family. She was a fervent advocate of the "divine right of kings" and believed that it was unnecessary to attempt to secure the approval of the people, according to her aunt, German Empress Frederick, who wrote to Queen Victoria that "Alix is very imperious and will always insist on having her own way; she will never yield one iota of power she will imagine she wields..." She dreaded social functions and enjoyed being alone with Nicholas, so she did not host the balls and parties that a tsarina normally would. Members of the Imperial family resented that she closed off their access to the tsar and the inner court. She disliked Nicholas's uncle, Grand Duke Vladimir Alexandrovich. She declared that Vladimir's sons Kirill, Boris and Andrei were irredeemably immoral. In 1913, she refused Boris's proposal for the hand of Grand Duchess Olga. During the war, Vladimir's wife, Grand Duchess Marie Pavlovna openly criticized Alexandra.

Insecure about her modest origins as a minor German princess, Alexandra insisted on being treated with the full honors due to an Empress. In 1896, Alexandra and Nicholas went on a European tour. When Wilhelm II lent her an antique silver toilette service that had once belonged to Queen Louise of Prussia, she was insulted and declared that only a gold service was suitable for an empress. She dressed herself "with great magnificence". At the Russian court, courtiers mocked for her "dress[ing] in the heavy brocade of which she was so fond, and with diamonds scattered all over her, in defiance of good taste and common sense."

Alexandra refused to court the public because she believed that the Russian people automatically loved and revered their Emperor and Empress. When she and Nicholas were traveling to Crimea by train, hundreds of peasants wore their best clothes and waited overnight to see the Imperial couple. Nicholas went to the window and waved, but Alexandra refused to open the curtains and acknowledge the crowd. Dowager Empress Marie was furious that "[Alexandra] thinks the Imperial family should be 'above that sort of thing.' What does she mean? Above winning the people's affection?...And yet, how often she complains of the public indifference toward her.” Queen Victoria worried about Alexandra's unpopularity in her new country, and she advised her granddaughter: "I’ve ruled more than 50 years ... and nevertheless every day I think about what I need to do to retain and strengthen the love of my subjects ... It is your first duty to win their love and respect." Alexandra replied, "You are mistaken, my dear grandmamma; Russia is not England. Here we do not need to earn the love of the people. The Russian people revere their Tsars as divine beings ... As far as Petersburg society is concerned, that is something which one may wholly disregard."

Struggle to bear an heir
On 15 November 1895, Alexandra gave birth to her eldest child and daughter, Olga, at the Alexander Palace. Many Russians and members of the Imperial family were disappointed in the sex of the child, but Nicholas and Alexandra were delighted with their daughter and doted on her. The birth of Olga did not change Grand Duke George's position as Nicholas's heir presumptive. The Pauline Laws implemented by Tsar Paul I forbade women from taking the Romanov throne as long as any male Romanov was alive. If Alexandra did not bear a son, Nicholas's heirs would be his brothers and uncles. However, few worried because Alexandra was only 23, so she was expected to be able to bear a son soon.

A few months after giving birth to Olga, Alexandra was pregnant again. Due to the stress of the coronation, she had a miscarriage. No announcement was made, because she had not publicly confirmed her pregnancy yet. However, there were unfounded and malicious rumors in St. Petersburg that Alexandra had become pregnant by a lover and aborted the baby to hide her infidelity.

On 10 June 1897, Alexandra gave birth to her second child and daughter, Tatiana. Nicholas was overjoyed, but the members of his family were unhappy and worried. When she woke up from the chloroform, Alexandra  saw the "anxious and troubled faces" around her and "burst into loud hysterics." She cried, "My God, it is again a daughter. What will the nation say, what will the nation say?" Alexandra's inability to have a son made her even more unpopular among the Russians. Nicholas's brother George said that he was disappointed not to have a nephew to relieve him of his duties as heir: "I was already preparing to go into retirement, but it was not to be.

On 26 June 1899, Alexandra gave birth to her third child and daughter, Maria. Queen Victoria sent Alexandra a telegram when Maria was born: “I am so thankful that dear Alicky has recovered so well, but I regret the third girl for the country.” Grand Duke Konstantin fretted: "And so there's no Heir. The whole of Russia will be disappointed by this news.” Russians saw the birth of a third daughter as proof that Alexandra was bad luck. Two weeks after Maria's birth, Nicholas's brother George died and Michael became the heir presumptive to the throne. Courtiers flocked to Michael and treated him as the heir apparent, which distressed Alexandra. In October 1900, Nicholas became ill with abdominal typhus and was confined to bedrest for five weeks. The cabinet were forced to discuss what would happen if Nicholas would die. Alexandra was pregnant with Anastasia, and she insisted that she be named regent in the hope that she would bear a son. However, Nicholas's ministers refused: If Nicholas died, Michael would become tsar. If Alexandra's baby was a boy, Michael would renounce the throne in his nephew's favor. Alexandra was not satisfied, and she grew to distrust Nicholas's ministers for trying to "steal" her future son's inheritance.

On 18 June 1901, Alexandra gave birth to Anastasia. Nicholas's sister, Grand Duchess Xenia, exclaimed, "My God! What a disappointment!… a fourth girl!" The French diplomat Maurice Paléologue reported: “The German [Alexandra] has the evil eye. Thanks to her nefarious influence our Emperor is doomed to catastrophe.” The Russian peasants decided that “the Empress was not beloved in heaven or she would have borne a son."

Alexandra and Nicholas turned to the faith in hopes of having a son. Shortly after Anastasia's birth, Grand Duchess Militza Nikolaevna introduced Alexandra to a mystic named Philippe Nizier-Vachot. He was an unlicensed quack who claimed that he could use his magnetic powers to change the sex of a baby inside the womb. Nicholas contrived a medical diploma from the Petersburg Military Medical Academy for Philippe and made him State Councilor and military doctor. Nicholas's mother (Marie), sister (Xenia), and sister-in-law (Ella) were alarmed and warned him and Alexandra to stay away from Philippe, but the Imperial couple did not heed their advice.

In the end of 1901, Alexandra seemed to have become pregnant again, and Philippe swore that she was carrying a boy. By the summer of 1902, it was clear that the Empress was not pregnant. Grand Duke Constantine Constantinovich of Russia wrote, "From 8 August we have been waiting every day for confirmation of the Empress's pregnancy. Now we have suddenly learned that she is not pregnant, indeed that there never was any pregnancy, and that the symptoms that led to suppose it were in fact only anaemia!". In reality, Alexandra had had a molar pregnancy. On 19 August 1902, she had suffered a discharge of "a spherical, fleshy mass the size of a walnut", which Dr. Ott confirmed was a dead fertilized egg in the fourth week of gestation. To save face, the court physicians published a bulletin on 21 August claiming that Alexandra had "a straightforward miscarriage, without any complications." Humiliated, Alexandra sent Philippe to France.

In 1903, Alexandra and Nicholas decided to support the canonisation of Seraphim of Sarov. Before he left Russia, Philippe told them that Seraphim would grant Alexandra a son. Seraphim was a monk in the Tambov region who had supposedly performed local miracles, he had been dead for seventy years. The Metropolitan of Moscow reluctantly agreed to canonize the saint. On 19 August, Alexandra and Nicholas bathed in the Sarov Spring in which Seraphim had once bathed and prayed that the sacred waters would bless them with a son.

In 1904, Alexandra became pregnant. There was high anticipation for a son. As her due date drew near, a newspaper noted that “a few days will decide whether the Czarina is to be the most popular woman in Russia, or regarded by the great bulk of the people as a castaway – under the special wrath of God.” On 12 August 1904, Alexandra gave birth to Alexei Nikolaevich in Peterhof. Alexei's birth affirmed Nicholas and Alexandra's faith in Philippe. In her diary, Nicholas's sister Olga wrote, "I am sure it was Seraphim who brought it about." Nicholas wrote to Militza to "pass on our gratitude and joy … to Philippe."

Relationship with her children

Alexandra had a distant relationship with Olga. She relied on Olga to keep her younger siblings in order. Her letters to Olga include frequent reminders to mind her siblings: "Remember above all to always be a good example to the little ones" and "Try to have a serious word with Tatiana and Maria about how they should conduct themselves towards God." Olga was frustrated by trying to keep her boisterous siblings in order, and she complained that her mother had no time for her. Olga preferred her father.

Alexandra was closest to her second daughter, Tatiana. Tatiana resembled Alexandra the most in terms of appearance and personality. She was described by her paternal aunt Xenia: "[Tatiana] and her mother are like as two peas in a pod!.... so pretty." She was cautious and reserved, and she was unquestioningly devoted to Alexandra. During the family's final months, she helped her mother by pushing her about the house in a wheelchair.

Maria felt insecure about her role in the family, and Alexandra frequently assured Maria that she was as loved as her siblings: “Sweet child you must promise me never again to think that nobody loves you. How did such an extraordinary idea get into your little head? Get it quickly out again.” Maria worried that Alexandra favored Anastasia over her, and Alexandra reassured her that "I have no secrets with Anastasia."

Anastasia physically resembled Alexandra, but her boisterous, mischievous personality was very different from her mother's. She was dubbed the shvibzik, Russian for "imp." During the family's last months, Anastasia was the only one who could make the melancholy Alexandra laugh.

Alexandra doted on Alexei because he was her only son and the heir to the Russian Empire. The children's tutor Pierre Gilliard wrote, "Alexei was the centre of a united family, the focus of all its hopes and affections. His sisters worshipped him. He was his parents' pride and joy. When he was well, the palace was transformed. Everyone and everything in it seemed bathed in sunshine." Alexandra was obsessed with trying to protect him from his disease of hemophilia. According to Gilliard, she “press[ed] the little boy to her with the convulsive movement of a mother who always seems in fear of her child's life." She sat at Alexei's bedside for days as he suffered through his fatal attacks. She feared that he would injure himself in tantrums, so she spoiled him and never punished him.

Despite her fears of never bearing a son, Alexandra loved her daughters and called them her "little four-leaved clover." She wrote that "our girlies are our joy and happiness" and "the apostles of God."

Health
Alexandra's health was never robust and her frequent pregnancies, with four daughters in six years and her son three years after, drew from her energy. Her biographers, including Robert Massie, Carrolly Erickson, Greg King, and Peter Kurth, attribute the semi-invalidism of her later years to nervous exhaustion from obsessive worry over the fragile tsarevich, who suffered from hemophilia. She spent most of her time in bed or reclining on a chaise in her boudoir or on a veranda. This immobility enabled her to avoid the social occasions that she found distasteful. Alexandra regularly took a herbal medicine known as adonis vernalis in order to regulate her pulse. She was constantly tired, slept badly, and complained of swollen feet. She ate little, but never lost weight (except for the last year of her life). She may have suffered from Graves disease (hyperthyroidism), a condition resulting in high levels of the thyroid hormone, which can also result in atrial fibrillation, poor heartbeat and lack of energy.

Haemophilia and Rasputin

Tsarevich Alexei Nikolaevich of Russia was heir apparent to the throne of Russia and the only son of Nicholas and Alexandra. Shortly after his birth, the court doctors realized that he had haemophilia. After his umbilical cord was cut, his stomach bled for days and his blood did not clot. Nicholas wrote that Alexei lost "1/8 to 1/9 of the total quantity" of his blood in 48 hours. Haemophilia had entered the royal houses of Europe via the daughters of Queen Victoria, including Alexandra's mother, Princess Alice. In the early 20th century, haemophilia was fatal and the average life expectancy of haemophiliacs was age 13. Alexandra's brother, Friedrich, and maternal uncle Prince Leopold, Duke of Albany, had died young of haemophilia. Alexandra's sister Princess Irene of Hesse and by Rhine and first cousin Princess Victoria Eugenie of Battenberg were also carriers of the haemophilia gene, and they had haemophiliac sons.

Alexandra felt immense guilt that she had passed down the disease to her son. Shortly after Alexei's diagnosis, she wept and told the nurse, “If only you knew how fervently I’ve prayed for God to protect my son from our inherited curse." Nicholas' sister Xenia called haemophilia "the terrible disease of the English family", and members of the Imperial family blamed Alexandra for "contaminating the Romanovs with the diseases of her own race."

Since the incurable illness threatened the sole son and heir of the emperor, the imperial family decided to keep his condition secret from the Russian people. They wanted to limit social instability because of uncertainty. At first, Alexandra turned to Russian doctors to treat Alexei. Their treatments generally failed. Burdened with the threats to her son from any fall or cut, Alexandra turned toward faith for comfort. She studied the Orthodox faith and saints, and spent hours daily praying in her private chapel for deliverance.

Grigori Rasputin, a peasant from Siberia, appeared to have a cure for her son by praying for him and became powerful in court as a result. Over time, Alexandra grew to believe that Rasputin was the only man who could save her son's life. Rasputin was straightforward with Alexandra and told her, “Neither the Emperor nor you can do without me. If I am not there to protect you, you will lose your son... within six months.” Alexandra blinded herself to evidence of Rasputin's debauchery and the harm his presence did to Imperial prestige. The director of the national police told Alexandra that a drunk Rasputin had exposed himself at a popular Moscow restaurant and bragged that Nicholas gave him sexual access to her, but she blamed the account on malicious gossip. "Saints are always calumniated," she once wrote. "He is hated because we love him." Nicholas recognized Rasputin's faults, but he felt powerless to do anything about the man who seemingly saved his only son's life. Pierre Gilliard wrote, "He did not like to send Rasputin away, for if Alexei died, in the eyes of the mother, he would have been the murderer of his own son."

From the start, members of the court exchanged gossip about Rasputin. Although some of St. Petersburg's top clergy accepted him as a living prophet, others angrily denounced him as a fraud and a heretic. Made up stories from his life in Siberia were heard in St. Petersburg. For instance, he was said to conduct weddings for villagers in exchange for sleeping on the first night with the bride. He lived in St. Petersburg with his two daughters and two housekeepers, and was often visited by persons seeking his blessing, a healing, or a favour with the tsarina. Women, enchanted by the healer, also came to Rasputin for advice and individual blessings and received a private audience in his apartment, jokingly called the "Holy of Holies". Rasputin liked to preach a unique theology that one must become familiar with sin before having a chance to overcome it. No one believed that Rasputin could heal Alexei, so court officials were confused as to why Alexandra was so dependent on him.

In 1912, Alexei suffered a life-threatening haemorrhage in the thigh while the family was at Spała in Poland. Alexandra sat for days at his bedside, and she rarely ate or slept. She cried helplessly when Alexei begged for death and asked her to bury him in a forest instead of the mausoleum with his Romanov ancestors. The doctors expected Alexei to die, and a priest performed his last rites. The court officials prepared an official telegram to announce the death of the Tsarevich. In desperation, Alexandra sent a telegram to Rasputin, who replied: "God has seen your tears and heard your prayers. Do not grieve. The Little One will not die. Do not allow the doctors to bother him too much." To the shock of his doctors, Alexei recovered his health and survived. From 1912, Alexandra came to rely increasingly on Rasputin and to believe in his ability to ease Alexei's suffering. It looked like this reliance enhanced Rasputin's political power, but it is hard to detach gossips from the truth. His role in the court seriously undermined Romanov rule during the First World War.

Rasputin was assassinated to end his perceived interference in political matters, on 30 December 1916. Amongst the conspirators were the nobleman Prince Felix Yusupov, who was married to Nicholas II's niece, Princess Irina of Russia, and Grand Duke Dmitri Pavlovich, who was once close to Nicholas and Alexandra's family.

World War I

The outbreak of World War I was a pivotal moment for Russia and Alexandra. The war pitted the Russian Empire of the Romanov dynasty against the German Empire of the Hohenzollern dynasty. When Alexandra learned of the Russian mobilization, she stormed into her husband's study and said: "War! And I knew nothing of it! This is the end of everything."

Alexandra's ties to Germany made her more unpopular among some societies in Russia. Her brother Ernest Louis ruled the Grand Duchy of Hesse and by Rhine, so he fought with the Germans. The German Emperor, Wilhelm II, was Alexandra's first cousin. Alexandra's sister, Irene, was married to Wilhelm's brother, Heinrich. Ironically, Alexandra was an ardent Russian patriot and disliked the German Emperor. She privately wrote that Wilhelm II "is really nothing but a clown. He has no real worth. His only virtues are his strict morals and his conjugal fidelity."

St. Petersburg's society accused her of collaboration with the Germans. In St. Petersburg, there was a rumor that Alexandra was hiding her brother Ernie in Russia. In 1916, Alexandra's lady-in-waiting wrote that she was asked "in all seriousness whether the Grand Duke of Hesse was not hidden in the cellars of the palace." Alexandra worked as a nurse to wounded soldiers, but her efforts went unappreciated. In St. Petersburg, there were rumors that Alexandra and Rasputin were carrying on nightly conversations with Wilhelm II in Berlin to negotiate a dishonorable peace.

When Nicholas travelled to the front line in 1915 to take personal command of the Army, he left Alexandra in charge as Regent in the capital Saint Petersburg. Her brother-in-law, Grand Duke Alexander Mikhailovich recorded, "When the Emperor went to war of course his wife governed instead of him."

It looked like Alexandra fired and appointed ministers based on Rasputin's self-serving advice, but those close to the Imperial family circle have denied this. In only sixteen months, she appointed four prime ministers, five ministers of interior, and three ministers of war.  “After the middle of 1915,” wrote Florinsky, “the fairly honorable and efficient group who formed the top of the bureaucratic pyramid degenerated into a rapidly changing succession of the appointees of Rasputin." Polivanov was an excellent official who was credited with revitalizing the Russian army, but Alexandra declared, "I don't like the choice of Minister of War Polivanov. Is he not our Friend's [Rasputin's] enemy?"  The general Grand Duke Nicholas Nikolaevich disliked Rasputin, because Rasputin saw and told Alexandra that the Grand Duke was deliberately currying favor in the army and overshadowing Nicholas II so that he could claim the throne. On 16 June, Alexandra wrote to Nicholas, "I have absolutely no faith in N.... [he has] gone against a Man of God (Rasputin), his work can't be blessed or his advice good... Russia will not be blessed if her sovereign lets a Man of God sent to help him be persecuted, I am sure." She insisted to Nicholas that "[Rasputin] has your interest and Russia's at heart. It is not for nothing God sent him to us, only we must pay more attention to what He says. His words are not lightly spoken and the importance of having not only his prayers but his advice is great."

Ever a believer in autocracy, Alexandra persuaded Nicholas that he must never relinquish his absolute power as Emperor. She wrote to him: "You are master and sovereign of Russia. Almighty God set you in place, and they should all bow down before your wisdom and steadfastness." She advised him to "Be Peter the Great, Ivan the Terrible, Emperor Paul-- crush them all." She criticized the Duma and declared “they want to discuss things not concerning them and bring more discontent—they must be kept away.... We are not ready for constitutional government.”

During the war, there was great concern within the imperial house about the influence empress Alexandra had upon state affairs through the Tsar, and the influence Grigori Rasputin was believed to have upon her, as it was considered to provoke the public and endanger the safety of the imperial throne and the survival of the monarchy. On behalf of the Imperial relatives of the Tsar, both Grand Duchess Elizabeth Feodorovna and Grand Duchess Victoria Feodorovna had been selected to mediate and ask Empress Alexandra to banish Rasputin from court to protect her and the throne's reputation, the former twice, but without success. In parallel, several of the Grand Dukes had tried to intervene with the Tsar, but with no more success.

During this conflict of 1916–1917, Grand Duchess Maria Pavlovna reportedly planned a coup d'état to depose the Tsar with the help of four regiments of the Imperial guard which were to invade the Alexander Palace, force the Tsar to abdicate and replace him with his underage son under the regency of her son Grand Duke Kirill Vladimirovich.

There are documents which support the fact that, in this critical situation, the empress dowager Maria Feodorovna was involved in a planned coup d'état to depose her son from the throne in order to save the monarchy. The plan was reportedly for Maria to make a final ultimatum to the Tsar to banish Rasputin unless he wished for her to leave the capital, which would be the signal to unleash the coup. Exactly how she planned to replace her son is unconfirmed, but two versions are available: first, that Grand Duke Paul Alexandrovich would take power in her name, and that she herself would thereafter become ruling empress; the other version claims that she and Grand Duke Paul Alexandrovich would replace the Tsar with his son, the heir to the throne, Maria's grandson Alexei, upon which Maria and Paul Alexandrovich would share power as regents during his minority. Reportedly, Empress Alexandra was informed about the planned coup, and when Maria Feodorovna made the ultimatum to the Tsar, the empress convinced him to order his mother to leave the capital. Consequently, the Dowager Empress left St. Petersburg to live in the Mariinskyi Palace in Kiev the same year. She never again returned to Russia's capital.

Revolution (1917)
World War I put what proved to be an unbearable burden on Imperial Russia's government and economy, both of which were dangerously weak. Mass shortages and hunger became the daily situation for tens of millions of Russians due to the disruptions of the war economy. Fifteen million men were diverted from agricultural production to fight in the war, and the transportation infrastructure (primarily railroads) was diverted towards war use, exacerbating food shortages in the cities as available agricultural products could not be brought to urban areas. Inflation was rampant. This, combined with the food shortages and the poor performance by the Russian military in the war, generated a great deal of anger and unrest among the people in Saint Petersburg and other cities.

The decision of the tsar to take personal command of the military was disastrous, as he was directly blamed for all losses. His relocation to the front, leaving the Empress in charge of the government, helped undermine the Romanov dynasty. The poor performance of the military led to rumours believed by the people that the German-born Empress was part of a conspiracy to help Germany win the war. Moreover, within several months of taking personal command of the army, the tsar replaced several capable ministers with less able men at the Empress's and Rasputin's behest; most notable among these replacements was replacing N. B. Shcherbatov with Alexei Khvostov as minister of the interior. The severe winter of 1916–17 essentially doomed Imperial Russia. Food shortages worsened and famine gripped the cities. The mismanagement and failures of the war turned the soldiers against the tsar. By 1917, the tsar realized that Russia could not fight the war much longer, and as railroads carried troops to the front there was little capacity left to bring food to the cities.

By March 1917, conditions had worsened even more. Steelworkers went out on strike on 7 March, and the following day, crowds hungry for bread began rioting on the streets of Saint Petersburg to protest food shortages and the war. After two days of rioting, the tsar ordered the Army to restore order and on 11 March they fired on the crowd. That very same day, the Duma, the elected legislature, urged the tsar to take action to ameliorate the concerns of the people. The tsar responded by dissolving the Duma.

On 12 March soldiers sent to suppress the rioting crowds mutinied and joined the rebellion, thus providing the spark to ignite the February Revolution (like the later October Revolution of November 1917, the Russian Revolutions of 1917 get their names due to the Old Style calendar). Soldiers and workers set up the "Petrograd Soviet" of 2,500 elected deputies while the Duma declared a Provisional Government on 13 March. Alexander Kerensky was a key player in the new regime. The Duma informed the tsar that day that he must abdicate.

In an effort to put an end to the uprising in the capital, Nicholas tried to get to Saint Petersburg by train from army headquarters at Mogiliev. The route was blocked so he tried another way. His train was stopped at Pskov where, after receiving advice from his generals, he first abdicated the throne for himself and later, on seeking medical advice, for himself and his son the Tsarevich Alexei.

Alexandra was now in a perilous position as the wife of the deposed tsar, hated by the Russian people. There were attempts made by the mutinous Tsarskoe Selo garrison to storm the Alexander Palace at Tsarskoe Selo, but the palace was successfully defended by the palace guards. The Palace guards and other troops gradually left for the capital after being informed about the abdication, and Alexandra asked the Duma to put in place security measures for her and her household in view of the riots and violence in the nearby capital. On 18 March Mikhail Rodzianko sent the newly appointed Minister of War, Alexander Guchkov, and General Kornilov to Alexandra to inspect the security of the Palace, which resulted in an officer being appointed to maintain the security of the Palace as well as a channel of communication between the Palace and the Duma.  After this, Alexandra noticed that the guards defending the palace gradually come to wear handkerchiefs around their wrists, signalling that they supported the Duma, which also meant that she and her children, while being defended from immediate harm, were nevertheless under de facto house arrest from that moment on. Alexandra and her children and household were not molested in any way, and the household was left to continue its everyday life as before, with the exception of occasional power cuts.  On 21 March, Kornilov informed Alexandra that she was formally under house arrest, and the members of the household were informed that they were free to leave if they wished, but if they chose to stay, they would have to obey the same rules as pertained to the house arrest of Alexandra.

The following day, on 22 March, Nicholas finally was allowed to return to the Alexander Palace at Tsarskoe Selo where he was placed under arrest with his family. Alexandra told him that "the husband and father was of more value in her eyes than the Emperor whose throne she had shared."

Imprisonment (1917–1918)

The Provisional Government formed after the revolution kept Nicholas, Alexandra, and their children confined under house arrest in their home, the Alexander Palace at Tsarskoye Selo. They were visited by Kerensky from the government, who interviewed Alexandra regarding her involvement in state affairs and Rasputin's involvement in them through his influence over her. She answered that as she and her spouse kept no secrets from each other, they often discussed politics and she naturally gave him advice to support him; as for Rasputin, he had been a true holy man of God, and his advice had been only in the interest of the good of Russia and the imperial family. After the interview, Kerensky told the tsar that he believed that Alexandra had told him the truth and was not lying.

The Provisional Government did not wish to keep the family in Russia, particularly as both the family as well as the Provincial Government were under threat from the Bolsheviks; they trusted that the former tsar and his family would be received in Great Britain, and ensured that inquiries were being made. Despite the fact he was a first cousin of both Nicholas and Alexandra, George V refused to allow them and their family permission to evacuate to the United Kingdom, as he was alarmed by their unpopularity in his country and the potential repercussions to his own throne. After this, it was suggested they be moved to France. However, although the French government was never asked, British diplomats in France reported that the family was not likely to be welcome there, as anti-German feelings were strong in France during the war and Alexandra was widely unpopular because she was believed to be a sympathizer of Germany. The Provisional Government was reportedly very disappointed that no foreign state seemed to be willing to receive the family, and was forced to act and relocate them within Russia, as the security situation was becoming more and more difficult.

In August 1917, the family were moved to Tobolsk in Siberia, a step by the Kerensky government designed to remove them from the capital and possible harm.  Nicholas and Alexandra had themselves suggested to be moved to the Livadia Palace in the Crimea, but Kerensky deemed this to be too dangerous: to get to the Crimea, they would have to travel through Central Russia, an area which was at that time affected by widespread revolutionary violence and riots where the upper classes and aristocracy was attacked by the public and their mansions burned. Tobolsk in Siberia was, in contrast to Central and Southern Russia, a calm and peaceful place with greater security and more sympathy for the former tsar. There were indications that the Provisional Government were actually attempting to transport them out of Russia by the Trans-Siberian Railway, thus fulfilling the government's wish to have them expelled, but now via a different route, after the first attempt to exile them to Europe had failed. However, this plan was not revealed to the family, and if it had indeed been the intent of the government, it had to be cancelled because of a strong Bolshevik presence in Ekaterinburg and other cities along the Trans-Siberian Railway east of Tobolsk, and the family therefore continued to their official destination.

From Tobolsk, Alexandra managed to send a letter to her sister-in-law, Xenia Alexandrovna, in Crimea:

Alexandra and her family remained in Tobolsk until after the Bolshevik Revolution in November 1917. The fall of the Provisional Government and the Bolshevik's accession to power greatly worsened their position.

In 1918, they were subsequently moved to Bolshevik controlled Yekaterinburg. Nicholas, Alexandra and their daughter Maria arrived at the Ipatiev House on 30 April 1918. On entering their new prison, they were ordered to open all their luggage. Alexandra immediately objected. Nicholas tried to come to her defence saying, "So far we have had polite treatment and men who were gentlemen but now -" The former Tsar was quickly cut off. The guards informed him he was no longer at Tsarskoe Selo and that refusal to comply with their request would result in his removal from the rest of his family; a second offence would be rewarded with hard labour. Fearing for her husband's safety, Alexandra quickly gave in and allowed the search. On the window frame of what was to be her last bedroom in the Ipatiev House, Alexandra scrawled a swastika, her favourite good luck symbol, and pencilled the date 17/30 April 1918. In May, the rest of the family arrived in Yekaterinburg. They had not been able to travel earlier due to the illness of Alexei. Alexandra was pleased to be reunited with her family once more.

Seventy-five men did guard duty at the Ipatiev House. Many of the men were factory workers from the local Zlokazovsky Factory and the Verkh-Isetsk Factory. The commandant of the Ipatiev House, Alexander Avadeyev was described as "a real Bolshevik". The majority of witnesses recall him as coarse, brutish and a heavy drinker. If a request for a favour on behalf of the family reached Avadeyev, he always gave the same response, "Let them go to hell!" The guards in the house often heard him refer to the deposed tsar as "Nicholas the Blood-Drinker" and to Alexandra as "The German Bitch".

For the Romanovs, life at the Ipatiev House was a nightmare of uncertainty and fear. The imperial family never knew if they would still be in the Ipatiev House from one day to the next or if they might be separated or killed. The privileges allowed to them were few. For an hour each afternoon they could exercise in the rear garden under the watchful eye of the guards. Alexei could still not walk, and his sailor Nagorny had to carry him. Alexandra rarely joined her family in these daily activities. Instead she spent most of her time sitting in a wheelchair, reading the Bible or the works of St. Seraphim. At night the Romanovs played cards or read; they received little mail from the outside world, and the only newspapers they were allowed were outdated editions.

Dmitri Volkogonov and other Soviet historians believe that indirect evidence indicates that Vladimir Lenin personally ordered the execution of the Imperial Family, although official Soviet accounts place the responsibility for the decision with the Ural Regional Soviet. Leon Trotsky, in his diary, makes it quite clear that the execution took place on the authority of Lenin. Trotsky wrote:

On 4 July 1918, Yakov Yurovsky, the chief of the Ekaterinburg Cheka, was appointed commandant of the Ipatiev House. Yurovsky was a loyal Bolshevik, a man Moscow could rely on to carry out its orders regarding the imperial family. Yurovsky quickly tightened security. From the imperial family he collected all of their jewellery and valuables. These he placed in a box which he sealed and left with the prisoners. Alexandra kept only two bracelets which her uncle Prince Leopold, Duke of Albany, had given her as a child and which she could not take off. He did not know that the former tsarina and her daughters wore concealed on their person diamonds, emeralds, rubies and ropes of pearls. These would be discovered only after the executions. Yurovsky had been given the order for the execution on 13 July.

On Sunday, 14 July 1918, two priests came to the Ipatiev House to celebrate the Divine Liturgy. One of the priests, Father Storozhev later recalled:

Execution

Tuesday, 16 July 1918 passed normally for the former imperial family. At four o'clock in the afternoon, Nicholas and his daughters took their usual walk in the small garden. Early in the evening Yurovsky sent away the fifteen-year-old kitchen boy Leonid Sedinev, saying that his uncle wished to see him. At 7 p.m., Yurovsky summoned all the Cheka men into his room and ordered them to collect all the revolvers from the outside guards. With twelve heavy military revolvers lying before him on the table he said, "Tonight, we shoot the entire family, everybody." Upstairs Nicholas and Alexandra passed the evening playing bezique; at ten thirty, they went to bed.

The former tsar, tsarina, and all of their family, including the gravely ill Alexei, along with several family servants, were executed by firing squad and bayonets in the basement of the Ipatiev House, where they had been imprisoned, early in the morning of 17 July 1918, by a detachment of Bolsheviks led by Yakov Yurovsky. In the basement room of the Ipatiev House, Alexandra complained that there were no chairs for them to sit on, whereupon Nicholas asked for and received three chairs from the guards. Minutes later, at about 2:15 a.m., a squad of soldiers, each armed with a revolver, entered the room. Their leader Yurovsky ordered the entire party to stand; Alexandra complied "with a flash of anger", and Yurovsky then casually pronounced, "Your relations have tried to save you. They have failed and we must now shoot you." Nicholas rose from his chair and only had time to utter "What...?" before he was shot several times, not (as is usually said) in the head, but in the chest; his skull bears no bullet wounds, but his ribs were shattered by at least three fatal bullet wounds. Standing about six feet from the gunmen and facing them, Alexandra watched the execution of her husband and two manservants before military commissar Peter Ermakov took aim at her.  She instinctively turned away from him and began to make the sign of the cross, but before she could finish the gesture, Ermakov killed her with a single gunshot which, as she had partly turned away, entered her head just above the left ear and exited at the same spot above her right ear. After all the victims had been shot, Ermakov in a drunken haze stabbed Alexandra's body and that of her husband, shattering both their rib cages and chipping some of Alexandra's vertebrae.

Identification of remains

After the execution of the Romanov family in the Ipatiev House, Alexandra's body, along with those of Nicholas, their children and some faithful retainers who died with them, was stripped and the clothing burnt according to the Yurovsky Note, a secret report by Yurovsky, which came to light in the late 1970s, but did not become public knowledge until the 1990s. Initially, the bodies were thrown down a disused mine-shaft at Ganina Yama, 12 miles (19 km) north of Yekaterinburg. A short time later, the bodies were retrieved. Their faces were smashed and the bodies, dismembered and disfigured with sulphuric acid, were hurriedly buried under railway sleepers with the exception of two of the children whose bodies were not discovered until 2007. The Yurovsky Note helped the authorities to locate the bodies. The missing bodies were those of a daughter—Maria or Anastasia—and Alexei. In the early 1990s, following the fall of the Soviet Union, the bodies of the majority of the Romanovs were located along with their loyal servants, exhumed and formally identified. Preliminary results of genetic analysis carried out on the remains of a boy and a young woman believed to belong to Nicholas II's son and heir Alexei, and daughter Anastasia or Maria were revealed on 22 January 2008. The Ekaterinburg region's chief forensic expert said, "Tests conducted in Yekaterinburg and Moscow allowed DNA to be extracted from the bones, which proved positive," Nikolai Nevolin said. "Once the genetic analysis has been completed in Russia, its results will be compared with test results from foreign experts." Nevolin said the final results would be published in April or May 2008. Certainty about the remains definitively put an end to the claim that Anna Anderson could be connected with the Romanovs, as all remaining bodies would be accounted for.

DNA analysis represented a key means of identifying the bodies. A blood sample from Prince Philip, Duke of Edinburgh (a grandson of Alexandra's oldest sister, Princess Victoria of Hesse and by Rhine) was employed to identify Alexandra and her daughters through their mitochondrial DNA. They belonged to Haplogroup H (mtDNA). Nicholas was identified using DNA obtained from, among others, his late brother Grand Duke George Alexandrovich of Russia. Grand Duke George had died of tuberculosis in the late 1890s and was buried in the Peter and Paul Fortress in St Petersburg.

Burial 
Alexandra, Nicholas II and three daughters plus the servants who were killed with them were reinterred in the St. Catherine Chapel of the Peter and Paul Cathedral at the Fortress of St. Peter and St. Paul in St. Petersburg in 1998, with much ceremony, on the eightieth anniversary of the execution.

Sainthood 

In 1981, Alexandra and her immediate family were recognised as martyrs by the Russian Orthodox Church Outside Russia. In 2000, Alexandra was canonized as a saint and passion bearer by the Russian Orthodox Church, together with her husband Nicholas II, their children and others including her sister Grand Duchess Elisabeth Feodorovna and the Grand Duchess's fellow nun Varvara.

In popular culture
 The best-selling 1895 American novel The Princess Aline by Richard Harding Davis was based on his infatuation with Alexandra.
 Rasputin and the Empress (1932), a fictionalized film less famous than the lawsuit it spawned. Alexandra was portrayed by Ethel Barrymore.
 The highly fictionalized 1966 film Rasputin, the Mad Monk, in which Renée Asherson portrayed the Empress.
 A rather romanticised version of Alexandra's life was dramatized in the 1971 movie Nicholas and Alexandra, based on the book by the same title written by Robert Massie, in which the tsaritsa/Empress was played by Janet Suzman.
 The song "Rasputin" is a 1978 Euro-disco hit single by the Germany-based group Boney M. It tells of Alexandra's alleged affair with Rasputin.
 1974's Fall of Eagles, a BBC series dramatizing the demise of the ruling families of Germany, Austria-Hungary and Russia. Alexandra, portrayed by American actress Gayle Hunnicutt, is a prominent character in the series.
 Rasputin: Dark Servant of Destiny is a 1996 HBO TV film for which Greta Scacchi won an Emmy for her portrayal of Empress Alexandra.
 Rasputin: The Mad Monk (1997), a biographical documentary.
 Anastasia (1997), an American animated musical fantasy drama film produced by Fox Animation Studios, where Empress Alexandra appears in flashbacks.
 The Romanovs: An Imperial Family (2000), a Russian film that explores the last year of the Imperial family after Nicholas's abdication, the house arrest of the family and eventual execution. Lynda Bellingham plays Empress Alexandra.
 The Lost Prince, a BBC mini-series made in 2003 about Prince John of the United Kingdom, the youngest son of King George V, in which Alexandra is played by Lithuanian actress Ingeborga Dapkūnaitė.
 The episode Love and Revolution devoted to the fall of the Romanov dynasty is featured in the Danish television A Royal Family, a series about the descendants of King Christian IX of Denmark.
 Alexandra Feodorovna is a main character in the stage play Ekaterinburg by David Logan.
 The 2019 Netflix docudrama The Last Czars explores the reign, and eventual demise, of Tsar Nicholas II. Alexandra was portrayed by Susanna Herbert.
 The execution of the Romanov family is depicted in Season 5, Episode 6 of Netflix docudrama The Crown, which is titled "Ipatiev House."

Honours

National decorations 
 : Dame of the Order of the Golden Lion, 28 March 1888
 : Dame Grand Cross of the Order of St. Catherine, April 1894

Foreign decorations 
 : Bailiff Grand Cross of Honour and Devotion
 : Dame Grand Cordon of the Order of the Precious Crown, 7 March 1896
 : Dame of the Order of Queen Saint Isabel, 9 April 1896
 : Dame of the Order of Louise, 1st Division, 5 September 1896
 : Dame Grand Cordon of the Order of Charity, 1 July 1902
 : Dame of the Order of Queen Maria Luisa, 23 April 1896
 :
 Queen Victoria Golden Jubilee Medal, 1887
 Royal Order of Victoria and Albert, 1st Class, 1896
  Persian Empire: Order of the Sun, 1st Class, 1900

Archives 
Alexandra Feodorovna's letters to Anna Vyrubova and Lili Dehn, written in the years 1916–1918, are preserved in the "Romanov collection" in the Beinecke Rare Book and Manuscript Library, Yale University (New Haven, Connecticut, USA).

Ancestry

References

Citations

General sources 

 Denton, C. S., Absolute Power, London: Arcturus Publishing, 2006. 
 Finestone, Jeffrey, The Last Courts of Europe, London: J M Dent & Sons, 1981. 
 Hall, Coryne, Little Mother of Russia, Holmes & Meier Publishers, 2001. 
 Hall, Coryne & Van Der Kiste, John, Once a Grand Duchess Xenia, Sister of Nicholas II, Phoenix Mill: Sutton Publishing, 2002. 
 King, Greg, The Last Empress, Citadel Press Book, 1994. .
 King, Greg The Court of the Last Tsar, John Wiley & Sons, 2006. .
 Kurth, Peter, Tsar: The Lost World of Nicholas and Alexandra, Allen & Unwin, 1995. 
 Lyons, Marvin, Nicholas II: The Last Tsar, London: Routledge & Kegan Paul, 1974. 
 Massie, Robert, Nicholas and Alexandra, London: Pan Books, 1967. online free to borrow
 Massie, Robert, The Romanovs: The Final Chapter, New York: Ballantine Books, 1995. 
 Tames, Richard, Last of the Tsars, London: Pan Books, 1972.  
 Vorres, Ian, The Last Grand Duchess, London: Finedawn Publishers, 1985 (3rd edition)

External links

"God in All Things: The Religious Outlook of Russia's Last Empress" by Janet Ashton
 
 Judge Not Lest Ye Be Judged' – in Defence of Empress Alexandra Feodorovna" by Paul Gilbert Paul Gilbert (Covers in part the tsarina's health)

|-

1872 births
1918 deaths
19th-century people from the Russian Empire
20th-century Russian people
19th-century women from the Russian Empire
20th-century Russian women
20th-century Christian saints
Russian saints of the Eastern Orthodox Church
Converts to Eastern Orthodoxy from Lutheranism
Duchesses of Holstein-Gottorp
Russian grand duchesses by marriage
German princesses
House of Hesse-Darmstadt
House of Holstein-Gottorp-Romanov
Ladies of the Royal Order of Victoria and Albert
Russian empresses consorts
Russian people of German descent
Russian people of English descent
Executed royalty
Executed German women
Executed Russian women
20th-century executions by Russia
Eastern Orthodox people executed by the Soviet Union
Murdered Russian royalty
Passion bearers
Victims of Red Terror in Soviet Russia
Burials at Saints Peter and Paul Cathedral, Saint Petersburg
Nicholas II of Russia
Nobility from Darmstadt
Executed people from Hesse
Dames of the Order of Saint Isabel
Christian female saints of the Late Modern era
Eastern Orthodox royal saints
Grand Cordons of the Order of the Precious Crown
Royal reburials
Nurses from the Russian Empire
People executed by Russia by firing squad
Women who experienced pregnancy loss
Daughters of monarchs